This page describes the qualification procedure for EuroBasket 2009.

Qualified teams

Eight teams have secured their places at the EuroBasket 2009 before the qualifications. Seven teams have qualified through the Qualifying Round, and one more team has qualified through the Additional Qualifying Round.

Qualified as the host nation:
 

Qualified through the participation at the 2008 Summer Olympics
 
 
 

Qualified through the participation at the FIBA World Olympic Qualifying Tournament 2008
 
 
 
 

Qualified through the Qualifying Round
 
 
 
 
 
 
 

Qualified through the Additional Qualifying Round

Qualification format
The Qualifying Round was held from 20 August to 20 September 2008. The draw for the Qualifying Round was held on 16 February 2008 in Venice, Italy. There were four groups, one group of five teams and three groups of four teams. The first team from each group and the three best second placed teams have qualified for EuroBasket 2009. The qualified teams were: Bulgaria, Great Britain, Israel, Latvia, Macedonia, Serbia and Turkey.

The best six of the remaining teams then went to the Additional Qualifying Round, which has been held from 5 to 30 August 2009, shortly before the start of the Final Round. The teams qualified for the Additional Qualifying Round were: Belgium, Bosnia and Herzegovina, Finland, France, Italy and Portugal. These six teams were divided in two groups of three teams each. After that, the winners of the groups, Belgium and France, have played each other for the last place in EuroBasket 2009, with France winning the two-leg match.

The last four teams have played in the Relegation Round, which was held from 5 to 20 August 2009. The teams qualified for the Relegation Round were: Czech Republic, Estonia, Hungary and Ukraine. The bottom two of these four teams, Czech Republic and Estonia, have been relegated to EuroBasket Division B championship. The two teams on top of the group, Hungary and Ukraine, have stayed in EuroBasket Division A.

The draw for the groups of the Final Round as well as for the order of the games of the Additional Qualifying Round and the Relegation Round was held in Warsaw, Poland on 8 November 2008.

EuroBasket 2009 was held from 7 to 20 September 2009.

Qualifying round

Draw seedings

Qualification groups
The draw for the Qualifying Round was held on 16 February 2008 in Venice, Italy.

Group A

Note: All times are local

Group B

Note: All times are local

Group C

Note: All times are local

Group D

Note: All times are local

Best group runners-up
Teams were ranked by basis of winning percentage (PCT), then goal efficiency or goal average.

Additional qualifying round
The draw for the groups of the Additional Qualifying Round was held in Warsaw, Poland on 8 November 2008. Six teams have been divided in two groups of three teams each. The winners of these groups, Belgium and France, have played each other for the last place in EuroBasket 2009, with France earning the spot at the end. The Additional Qualifying Round has been held from 5 to 30 August 2009.

Draw seedings

Group A

Note: All times are local

Group B

Note: All times are local

Additional qualifying round play-off

Relegation round
The draw for the order of the games of the Relegation Round was held in Warsaw, Poland on 8 November 2008. Four teams have played home and away matches in a round-robin tournament. At the end, the two teams topping the group, Hungary and Ukraine, have stayed in Division A and the two teams at the bottom, Czech Republic and Estonia, have been relegated to EuroBasket Division B championship. The Relegation Round was held from 5 to 20 August 2009.

Group C

Note: All times are local

See also
Eurobasket 2009 Division B – Montenegro and Georgia have been promoted from the EuroBasket Division B to qualify in Division A, thus replacing Czech Republic and Estonia in the qualifications for the EuroBasket 2011.

References

External links
 EuroBasket qualification at eurobasket2009.org

qualification
2008–09 in European basketball
2009–10 in European basketball
2009